VEB may stand for:

 Venturing and Emerging Brands, a division of Coca-Cola
 Virtual business
 Venezuelan , currency of Venezuela between 1879 and 2007, ISO 4217 code VEB
  (German for "People-owned enterprise"), a state-owned workplace or establishment in the Cold-War-era East Germany
 , the state-owned Russian Development Bank
 Volvo Engine Brake (VEB), A modern brake technology has been used in FH-series
 Van Emde Boas tree (vEB), A dictionary data-structure.